Caritas may refer to:

 The Latin term for charity, one of the three theological virtues

Religion
 Caritas Internationalis, a confederation of Roman Catholic relief, development and social service organisations
 Caritas Christi Health Care, a non-profit Roman Catholic healthcare system in the New England region of the United States
 Caritas Hospital, a hospital located in Kottayam district, Kerala, India
 Caritas Hong Kong, a charitable organisation of Caritas founded in July 1953
 Caritas Macau, the charity outreach of the Diocese of Macau, China founded in 1971
 Caritas Social Action Network, an agency of the Catholic Bishops' Conference of England and Wales
 Deus caritas est, the first encyclical of Pope Benedict XVI.
 Caritas in Veritate, the third encyclical of Pope Benedict XVI; his first on social justice issues

Education
 Caritas Academy, an all-girls private, Roman Catholic high school in Jersey City, New Jersey
 Caritas Institute of Community Education, an institute of higher education

Other
 Caritas (yacht), a private yacht
 Las Caritas, a collection of Indian inscriptions in a rock formation in the Dominican Republic
 Caritas, a bar in the U.S. television series Angel (1999 TV series)
 Caritas (Ponzi scheme), a pyramid investment in the early 1990s in Cluj-Napoca, Romania
 Caritas Well or Caritas Fountain, a Renaissance fountain in Copenhagen, Denmark

See also
 Carità (disambiguation)
 Charites, a group of minor goddesses in Greek mythology
 Deus caritas est (disambiguation)
 "Ubi caritas", a hymn of the Western Church associated with Maundy Thursday
 "O Caritas", a song on the Cat Stevens album Catch Bull at Four